Fabien Sanchez (born 30 March 1983 in Hyères) is a French retired professional track cyclist. He won the bronze medal in men's team pursuit at the 2003 UCI Track Cycling World Championships, and later represented his nation France in two editions of the Olympic Games (2004 and 2008). Sanchez is also a four-time French track cycling champion in both the individual and team pursuit and in the points race.

Racing career
Before his professional cycling career, Sanchez sought headlines in the international scene, when he led the French team for the gold in a team pursuit final match against the Germans at the 2001 UCI Junior Track Cycling World Championships in Trexlertown, Pennsylvania, United States.

On that same year, he delivered the French foursome a bronze-medal time of 4:04.119 to defeat the Russians in men's team pursuit at the UCI Track Cycling World Championships in Stuttgart, Germany, earning them a guaranteed spot for the Olympics.

An official member of the French cycling team, Sanchez made his debut at the 2004 Summer Olympics in Athens, where he finished sixth in the men's individual pursuit (4:21.235), and seventh in the men's team pursuit (4:07.336), along with Anthony Langella, Mathieu Ladagnous, and Jérôme Neuville.

At the end of 2006 season, Sanchez decided to return to his amateur sporting career, and later joined the La Pomme Marseille Cycling Club.

The following year, Sanchez qualified for his second French squad, as a 25-year-old, in the men's individual pursuit at the 2008 Summer Olympics in Beijing based on the nation's selection process from the UCI Track World Rankings. Sanchez could not produce a more striking effort in the prelims after losing out his 4 km opening match to Australia's Brett Lancaster by a seven-second gap in 4:33.100, dropping him to fifteenth place in the overall standings.

Setting up his official retirement from competitive cycling in 2010, Sanchez currently works on a full-time position as an athletic director for La Pomme Marseille Cycling Club.

Career highlights

2001
  UCI Junior World Championships (Team pursuit), Trexlertown, Pennsylvania (USA)
2003
  UCI Track Cycling World Championships (Team pursuit), Stuttgart (GER)
 3rd French Championships (Individual pursuit), Hyères (FRA)
2004
 1st  French Championships (Individual pursuit), Hyères
 6th Olympic Games (Individual pursuit), Athens (GRE)
 7th Olympic Games (Team pursuit), Athens (GRE)
2005
 1st  French Championships (Team pursuit), France
 2nd French Championships (Individual pursuit), France
2007
 1st  French Championships (Individual pursuit), Hyères (FRA)
 2nd French Championships (Points race), Hyères (FRA)
 3rd French Championships (Team pursuit), Hyères (FRA)
2008
 1st  French Championships (Points race), France
 2nd French Championships (Individual pursuit), France
 15th Olympic Games (Individual pursuit), Beijing (CHN)

References

External links
French Olympic Team Profile 
NBC 2008 Olympics profile

1983 births
Living people
French male cyclists
French track cyclists
Cyclists at the 2004 Summer Olympics
Cyclists at the 2008 Summer Olympics
Olympic cyclists of France
Sportspeople from Hyères
Cyclists from Provence-Alpes-Côte d'Azur